Rabbit Creek may refer to:

Rabbit Creek (Alaska), a creek in Anchorage, Alaska
Rabbit Creek (Nevada), a creek in Nevada, United States
Rabbit Creek (Nipissing District), a creek in Ontario, Canada
Rabbit Creek (South Dakota), a creek in South Dakota, United States

See also 
Rabbit River (disambiguation)